The 1978–79 Yugoslav Second League season was the 33rd season of the Second Federal League, the second level association football competition of SFR Yugoslavia, since its establishment in 1946. The league was contested in two regional groups (West Division and East Division), with 16 clubs each.

West Division

Teams
A total of sixteen teams contested the league, including eleven sides from the 1977–78 season, one club relegated from the 1977–78 Yugoslav First League and four sides promoted from the 1977–78 Yugoslav Third League. The league was contested in a double round robin format, with each club playing every other club twice, for a total of 30 rounds. Two points were awarded for wins and one point for draws.

Čelik Zenica were relegated from the 1977–78 Yugoslav First League after finishing the season in 17th place of the league table. The four clubs promoted to the second level were Bosna, Mercator, Segesta and Spartak Subotica.

League table

Top scorers

East Division

Teams
A total of sixteen teams contested the league, including eleven sides from the 1977–78 season, one club relegated from the 1977–78 Yugoslav First League and four sides promoted from the 1977–78 Yugoslav Third League. The league was contested in a double round robin format, with each club playing every other club twice, for a total of 30 rounds. Two points were awarded for wins and one point for draws.

Trepča were relegated from the 1977–78 Yugoslav First League after finishing the season in 18th place of the league table. The four clubs promoted to the second level were Budućnost Peć, Galenika Zemun, Jedinstvo Bijelo Polje and Tikveš.

League table

Top scorers

See also
1978–79 Yugoslav First League
1978–79 Yugoslav Cup

References
General

Yugoslav Second League seasons
Yugo
2